Artus (born Victor Artus Solaro) is a French actor and humorist.

Filmography

Theater

One Man Show
 2010: C'était bien quand je serai p'tit
 2011: Va jouer sur l’autoroute
 2012-13: De A à S
 2014: Al Dente
 2015-16: Saignant à point

Television
From 2011 to 2014, he presented sketches on the show On n'demande qu'à en rire, where he gained notoriety.

He is the host of the 2019 Netflix original show Nailed It! France!

Other
In 2016, he was a contestant during the Seventh season of Danse avec les stars and he reaches the final.

In 2017, he host the 11th Globes de Cristal Award with Estelle Denis.

References

External links

 

Living people
1987 births
French male film actors
French male television actors
21st-century French male actors
People from Yvelines